Marek Maślany (born 11 July 1966) is a Polish weightlifter. He competed in the men's middle heavyweight event at the 1996 Summer Olympics.

References

1966 births
Living people
Polish male weightlifters
Olympic weightlifters of Poland
Weightlifters at the 1996 Summer Olympics
People from Lublin Voivodeship